Scooby-Doo! and WWE: Curse of the Speed Demon (also known as Scooby-Doo! WrestleMania Mystery 2) is a 2016 direct-to-DVD animated comedy mystery racing film, a sequel to Scooby-Doo! WrestleMania Mystery and the twenty-seventh entry in the direct-to-video series of Scooby-Doo films. It is a co-production between Warner Bros. Animation and WWE Studios. It premiered at the San Diego Comic-Con on July 23, 2016, followed by a digital release on July 26, 2016. It was released on DVD on August 8, 2016, in the United Kingdom. The film was also released on both DVD and Blu-Ray on August 9, 2016, in the United States by Warner Home Video.

Plot
After helping WWE solve the mystery of the Ghost Bear in Scooby-Doo! WrestleMania Mystery, the Mystery Inc. gang is seen at WWE's latest venture, The Muscle Moto X Off Road Challenge, an off-road race for WWE superstars, with a big cash prize. Scooby-Doo and Shaggy are there working at a food truck. Many WWE superstars are in the race, including WWE chairman Vince McMahon's own daughter Stephanie McMahon and her husband Triple H. Scooby and Shaggy are excited to hear that The Undertaker is going to be in the race.

Suddenly a demon racer named Inferno appears in a big race to sabotage the race. Shaggy and Scooby try to run away with the food from their truck, but before they can, Mr. McMahon hires Mystery Inc. to solve the mystery. Mr. McMahon wants Stephanie to pull out of the race, but she refuses. After learning they both have wealthy dads, Daphne becomes friends with Stephanie, making Velma feel very left out. The Undertaker is disappointed that his partner, Dusty Rhodes was injured in the race and recruits Shaggy and Scooby to be his new partners under their names "Skinny Man" and "Dead Meat", to which they reluctantly agree to at first. However, since Undertaker's car was also destroyed in Inferno's attack, Fred modifies Shaggy and Scooby's food truck so they and Undertaker can race that car instead and nicknames it "The Scoobinator".

During the first race, Inferno attacks the racers again and Velma, Daphne and Fred notice that Mr. McMahon is nowhere to be seen. That night Scooby and Shaggy are chased by Inferno only to be saved by The Miz. The following morning, Inferno attacks again and Scooby, Shaggy and The Undertaker almost drown when The Scoobinator lands in water. Luckily, the trio is able to escape.  That night, Daphne tells Velma even though she enjoyed hanging out with Stephanie, Velma will always be her best friend. The following day, Fred modifies the Mystery Machine so Scooby, Shaggy and Undertaker can race it in the final race. This time he, Daphne and Velma join the three of them in the car. Sure enough, Inferno attacks once more and goes after the gang. However, the other WWE stars in the race gang up on Inferno and attack his car with theirs. Inferno fights the undertaker who wins and then unmasks him. They figure out that he is using radio technology to drive his car so they made a remote that would disrupt his signal and control over the demon vehicle.

After an action-filled showdown, Inferno is defeated and unmasked to be Triple H. He and Stephanie used the costume to win the race. Stephanie mostly masterminded the plan because she was mad at her father for not letting her get in the race. Mr. McMahon apologizes saying he only wanted her safe, but still allows the police to take Stephanie and Triple H to jail. With Stephanie and Triple H disqualified, Scooby, Shaggy, and The Undertaker win the cash prize by default.

Voice cast
Frank Welker as Scooby-Doo, Fred Jones
Matthew Lillard as Shaggy Rogers
Grey Griffin as Daphne Blake
Kate Micucci as Velma Dinkley
The Undertaker as himself
Triple H as himself
Stephanie McMahon as herself
Goldust as himself
Sheamus as himself
Stardust as himself
Dusty Rhodes as himself (posthumous role)
The Miz as himself
Paige as herself
Diego as himself
El Torito as himself
Fernando as himself
Lana as herself
Rusev as himself
Michael Cole as himself
Kofi Kingston as himself
Vince McMahon as himself
Eric Bauza as Big Earl
Steve Blum as Inferno
Phil Morris as Walter Qualls

Production
On September 15, 2014, WWE and Warner Bros. announced a direct sequel to WrestleMania Mystery to be released in 2016. In February 2016, it was announced it will be named Scooby-Doo! and WWE: Curse of the Speed Demon. Hulk Hogan was billed to be prominently featured. However, on July 23, 2015, WWE terminated their contract with Hogan due to his racist comments; he has no role in the final version of the film. This film also marks the final film for Dusty Rhodes who already did voicework prior to his death a year before the film's release. It is the third co-production between Warner Bros. Animation and WWE Studios after Scooby-Doo! WrestleMania Mystery and The Flintstones & WWE: Stone Age SmackDown!

The film's original score was composed by Ryan Shore.

References

External links

Twitter post

2016 direct-to-video films
2016 animated films
2016 films
2010s American animated films
2010s sports films
American auto racing films
American television films
Animated crossover films
2010s English-language films
Direct-to-video professional wrestling films
Scooby-Doo direct-to-video animated films
WWE Studios films
Warner Bros. direct-to-video animated films
WrestleMania
Animated films about auto racing
American children's animated mystery films
American children's animated comedy films
Cultural depictions of The Undertaker
2010s children's animated films
Films scored by Ryan Shore
Animation based on real people